Partido Socialista de los Trabajadores (PST) was a trotskyist Spanish political party founded in 1979 and dissolved in 1993. The PST presented lists in coalition with the Revolutionary Workers' Party (PORE), but despite being one of the parties of the Spanish radical left with better election results it was always an extra-parliamentary party.

History
On February 1, 1980 Yolanda González Martín, a prominent student leader and member of the PST, was kidnapped and murdered in Madrid by members of a right-wing terrorist group. Her murderer today works for the Ministry of the Interior.

In 1993 it was divided into two sectors: PST (Verdad Socialista), which in 1994 merged with the Group for the construction of a Revolutionary Workers Party (GPOR) to create the Workers' Revolutionary Party (PRT), that in 1998 joined United Left; and PST (Contra Corriente) that was dissolved a few months later.

Election results

References

Communist parties in Spain
Political parties established in 1979
1979 establishments in Spain